Billy Six (born 24 December 1986) is a German activist, YouTuber, journalist, documentarian, and author. He was a war reporter for German newspaper Junge Freiheit in Egypt in 2011, and since then he has reported in many conflict zones, such as Libya, Syria, Lebanon, and Ukraine. He has been arrested several times in his journalistic career. Six does video reporting for his YouTube channel, where he describes himself as the 'Indiana Jones of journalism'. He has also written for different German newspapers and print magazines, including D Magazine, Junge Freiheit, Magazin Raum & Zeit, Globetrotter, and Preußische Allgemeine.

Early life
Six was born in 1986 in East Berlin. His professional career started as a business administrator and member in local parliament of Neuenhagen, after graduating from high school in 2006.

Journalistic career 

Early in his career, Six covered the refugees in Europe, researching the border area between Greece and Macedonia, at Budapest main station or Freilassing border crossing into Germany. He was traveling a month with the refugees; his results were published by Junge Freiheit TV: ″The Refugee Deception″.

Syria 

Six was arrested in Syria by the Syrian army in December 2012 while working for Junge Freiheit. He was held for 12 weeks under local laws, until he was released to Russian diplomats residing in Damascus.

Germany 

On 2 August 2016, together with British journalist Graham Phillips, he entered the Berlin office of the investigative journalism organisation Correctiv without permission, accompanying Phillips who demanded an interview with Marcus Bensmann, who was investigating Malaysia Airlines Flight 17. Phillips repeatedly accused Bensmann of lying, shouting "Lying press!", while filming the incident, and refusing to leave. Correctiv called the police, however Phillips and Six evaded them.

COVID 19 

Six played an active role in producing videos related to coronavirus, describing the pandemic as 'pure scaremongering'. A Bayern hospital which Six had filmed, making it out to be empty, reportedly filed charges against him for unauthorised filming. Six had several of his videos on the theme removed from YouTube, and he was further criticised by Corrective for his position on, and reporting on COVID-19.

Apparently having problems in Germany due to his covid activism, Six left for some time to Georgia.

Venezuela 

He was indicted of espionage, rebellion, and violation of security zones, accused of being a German spy and presented before a military court; his defense declared that the charges "were without foundation".

On 13 December 2018, Six began a hunger strike. The case of Six attracted much controversy; Reporters Without Borders declared that the allegations were unproven and called for his release.

On 16 March 2019, Six was granted conditional permission to leave the country. The conditions included reporting to authorities at 15-day intervals and a ban of media coverage.

Ukraine 

Six has often worked in Ukraine, covering the War in Donbas (2014–2022). He has also worked extensively on the Malaysia Airlines Flight 17 (MH17) incident, spending time in the city of Lugansk. He was interviewed by the BBC in the documentary Conspiracy Files: Who Shot Down MH17 (May 2016). Six has also given an interview to investigative agency Bellingcat on the theme.

Books 
 Das grüne Irrlicht (about German politician Hans-Christian Ströbele) (2012)
 Marsch ins Ungewisse (about Syria) (2014)
 Schuldig im Namen der Asyl-Industrie (2016)

See also 

MH17
Eliot Higgins

References

1986 births
Living people
German male journalists
German documentary filmmakers
German male writers
People from East Berlin
Prisoners and detainees of Venezuela
Film people from Berlin